Ingelmunster Castle is a stately home in Ingelmunster, West Flanders, Belgium.

See also
List of castles in Belgium

Castles in Belgium
Castles in West Flanders